Rhaphiptera elegans is a species of beetle in the family Cerambycidae. It was described by Stephan von Breuning in 1961. It is known from Brazil.

References

elegans
Beetles described in 1961